Mario Hernández may refer to:

 Mario Hernández (fashion house), a Colombian fashion house
 Mario Hernández (film director) (1936–2015), Mexican film director and screenwriter
 Mario Hernandez (comics) (born 1953), American writer, artist and comics publisher
 Mario Hernández (footballer, born 1957), Mexican football forward and manager
 Mario Fernando Hernández (1966–2008), Honduran politician
 Mario Hernández (footballer, born 1979), Mexican football defender
 Mario Hernández (footballer, born 1999), Spanish football left-back